The English new wave/pop rock band Tears for Fears have released seven studio albums, along with numerous singles, compilations and videos. Formed in 1981 by Roland Orzabal and Curt Smith, the duo signed to Phonogram Records in the UK and released their first single the same year. It was not until Tears for Fears' third single, "Mad World" (1982), that they scored their first hit, and their platinum-selling debut album The Hurting (1983) was a UK number one.

Their second album, Songs from the Big Chair, was released in 1985 and became a worldwide hit, establishing the band in the US. After a third platinum-selling studio album, The Seeds of Love (1989), Smith and Orzabal parted company. The band's first Greatest Hits album was released in 1992 and went double platinum in the UK. Subsequent Tears for Fears studio albums Elemental (1993) and Raoul and the Kings of Spain (1995) were effectively solo albums by Orzabal. However, the duo reformed in 2000 for a new studio album, Everybody Loves a Happy Ending, which was released in 2004/05. Although continuing to tour regularly across the world, the band's recording output slowed down for several years. A new compilation album, Rule the World: The Greatest Hits, was released in 2017, giving the band their sixth UK Top 20 album. After a lengthy development, the band's seventh studio album, The Tipping Point, was released in February 2022.

Albums

Studio albums

Live albums

Compilation albums

Other compilations
(The following compilations tended to be regional releases, issued without the band's involvement and often on "budget price" labels)

Box sets

EPs

Singles

Videos

Video albums

Music videos

Notes

References

External links
British Phonographic Industry
Recording Industry Association of America

Discographies of British artists
Pop music group discographies
New wave discographies